Outerbridge Horsey III  (March 5, 1777 – June 9, 1842) was an American lawyer and politician from Wilmington, Delaware. He was a member of the Federalist Party, who served in the Delaware General Assembly, as Attorney General of Delaware (1806–1810) and as United States Senator from Delaware (1810–1821).

Early life, education and marriage
Horsey was born in Little Creek Hundred, near Laurel,Sussex County, Delaware. After living in Georgetown, he moved to Wilmington, and studied the law there under James A. Bayard, who remained his lifelong political mentor. A frequent supporter of education, Horsey, early in his career, urged the establishment of a library in Georgetown, and later was appointed a trustee of the College of Wilmington.

He married Elizabeth Digges Lee, daughter of former Governor Thomas Sim Lee (1745-1819) of Maryland. They had at least two sons who survived to adulthood, Outerbridge Horsey (1819-1902) and Thomas Sim Lee Horsey (1816-1834). Although the latter had no surviving children, the former's son (this man's grandson) Outerbridge Horsey (1875-1931) lived in New York, and his son (this man's great grandson)Outerbridge Horsey (diplomat) (1910-1983) became a career U.S. diplomat and lived in the District of Columbia, as does his son of thesame name.

Early legal career
He was admitted to the Delaware Bar in December 1807, and began a practice in Wilmington.  One source believes he served as a delegate in Delaware's legislature in 1800-1802, but his father may have shared the same name.

Horsey owned more than 36 slaves during his life, and freed some of them as he grew older. Seven months after his marriage, on November 11, 1812, he manumitted fourteen enslaved people, including four enslaved people whom Elizabeth Lee Horsey had bought from her father in 1806.

Professional and political career
While practicing the law and after representing Sussex County in the Delaware State House from the 1801 session through the 1803 session, Horsey was appointed to be the Delaware Attorney General and served from 1806 to 1810.

In 1810 he was elected to the U.S. Senate to fill the vacancy caused by the death of U.S. Senator Samuel White. In the Senate he initially opposed the War of 1812 strongly, but once it had been declared, he supported it with equal vigor. He accordingly became a member of the Committee of Safety and was actively involved in preparing the defenses of Fort Union and Wilmington. In March 1814 Horsey presented a petition from the citizens of Delaware to repeal the Embargo Act of 1807; although he was able to get a committee appointed to consider the question, the effort was ultimately unsuccessful. He was reelected in 1814, and served from January 12, 1810, to March 3, 1821.

Following the War of 1812, but while still a contentious subject, the need for internal improvements had become much more apparent and recognized. It would be on Horsey's motion in January 1816, that the Senate finally passed the resolution to print and distribute copies of Treasury Secretary Albert Gallatin's 1808 Report on the Subject of Public Roads and Canals. The report, which had been requested by the Senate in 1807 and transmitted to it in 1808 had fallen victim to the embargo, the loss of revenue, and the necessities of war. With the report's distribution, many of its concepts would be incorporated into the Bonus Bill of 1817.

Several years later, he parted ways with the Delaware General Assembly which had passed a resolution asking Delaware's congressmen to vote against any extension of slavery. Horsey did not feel U.S. Congress had the right to prohibit slavery in Missouri, or anywhere else in the Louisiana Purchase, and so supported the Missouri Compromise. Understanding the unpopularity of this position, he did not seek reelection when his term ended. During the 16th Congress, he served as Chairman of the Committee on the District of Columbia.

Death and legacy
Horsey died at Needwood, his wife's estate near Petersville and Burkittsville in Frederick County, Maryland. He is buried in St. John's Cemetery at Petersville.

He owned the Zachariah Ferris House, listed on the National Register of Historic Places in 1970. The main house at Needwood Farms, operated by his brother in law Thomas S. Lee, who sympathized with the Confederacy during the Civil War, remains and is eligible for the National Register of Historic Places, although the Horsey Distillery did not survive the conflict. His son, also Outerbridge Horsey (1819-1902), was a Democratic politician who represented Frederick County at the 1867 state constitutional convention.

Almanac
Elections were held the first Tuesday of October. Members of the State House took office on the first Tuesday of January for a term of one year. The General Assembly chose the U.S. Senators, who took office March 4 for a six-year term. In this case he was initially completing the existing term, the vacancy caused by the death of Samuel White.

Notes

References

External links
Biographical Directory of the United States Congress
Delaware’s Members of Congress

The Political Graveyard

Places with more information
Delaware Historical Society; website; 505 North Market Street, Wilmington, Delaware 19801; (302) 655-7161
University of Delaware; Library website; 181 South College Avenue, Newark, Delaware 19717; (302) 831-2965

1777 births
1842 deaths
People from Wilmington, Delaware
Delaware lawyers
Delaware Federalists
Delaware Attorneys General
Members of the Delaware House of Representatives
United States senators from Delaware
Burials in Maryland
19th-century American lawyers